The Fanes-Sennes-Prags Nature Park is a nature reserve in the Dolomites in South Tyrol, Italy.

References 
Civic network of South Tyrol

External links 

Fanes-Sennes-Prags
1980 establishments in Italy